Nikolay Atanasov (born 20 May 1924) was a Bulgarian gymnast. He competed in eight events at the 1952 Summer Olympics.

References

External links
 

1924 births
Possibly living people
Bulgarian male artistic gymnasts
Olympic gymnasts of Bulgaria
Gymnasts at the 1952 Summer Olympics
People from Botevgrad
Sportspeople from Sofia Province